Karl Fries is the name of:

 Karl Friedrich Fries (1831–1871), German painter
 Karl Theophil Fries (1875–1962), German chemist